Nikolay Davydenko and Denis Istomin were the defending champions, but Davydenko retired from professional tennis in October 2014. Istomin played alongside Alexander Kudryavtsev, but they lost in the first round to Dominic Inglot and Florin Mergea.
Marcus Daniell and Artem Sitak won the title, defeating Inglot and Mergea in the final, 3–6, 6–4, [16–14].

Seeds

Draw

Draw

References 
 Main Draw

O
Doubles